The Fragile Heart is a BAFTA award-winning British medical drama television series created by Paula Milne and first aired on Channel 4 from 6 to 20 November 1996. The series nominated the Royal Television Society award for Best Drama Serial.

Story 
Edgar Pascoe (Nigel Hawthorne) is a highly successful and charismatic cardiac surgeon. Pre-eminent in his field, he is the embodiment of the upper echelons of medicine: urbane, assured, supremely confident in his own abilities. But he is not infallible - either in the operating theatre or in his private life with his divided family.

Edgar's wife Lileth (Dearbhla Molloy), a dedicated and compassionate country GP, is increasingly drawn to the holistic arts of healing still practiced in the East, but scorned by purveyors of Western technology. As their professional ideals and methods clash, so inevitably does their relationship. Nicola (Helen McCrory) is Edgar's favoured child, ruthless and unscrupulous in her ambition to emulate her illustrious father.

But it is in China, heading a medical delegation, that Edgar is confronted by an ethical dilemma over the abuse of human rights and is forced into a painful moral awakening which will prove to affect every area of his life.

Cast

Award 
 BAFTA Awards 1997
 Won Best Actor : Nigel Hawthorne
 Nominated Best Drama Serial : Brian Eastman, Patrick Lau, Paula Milne 
 Best Editing (Fiction/Entertainment) : Neil Thomson 
 Banff Television Festival 1997
 Won Best Mini-Series : Paula Milne, Carnival Film & Television 
 Royal Television Society, UK 1997
 Nominated Best Drama Serial 
 Nominated Best Actor - Female : Dearbhla Molloy 
 London Film Critics' Circle
 Nominated Actress of the Year : Helen McCrory

Home Media
The Fragile Heart was released on DVD on 8 October 2018.

References

External links
 
 The Fragile Heart at the FilmAffinity

1996 British television series debuts
1996 British television series endings
1990s British drama television series
Channel 4 television dramas
Television shows set in England
Television shows set in Hong Kong
1990s British medical television series
1990s British television miniseries
English-language television shows